Vexitomina torquata is a species of sea snail, a marine gastropod mollusk in the family Horaiclavidae.

Description
The length of the shell varies between 15 mm and 20 mm.

Distribution
This marine species is endemic to Australia and occurs off New South Wales, Queensland and Victoria.

References

 Laseron, C. 1954. Revision of the New South Wales Turridae (Mollusca). Australian Zoological Handbook. Sydney : Royal Zoological Society of New South Wales 1-56, pls 1-12.
 Powell, A.W.B. 1969. The family Turridae in the Indo-Pacific. Part. 2. The subfamily Turriculinae. Indo-Pacific Mollusca 2(10): 207–415, pls 188-324
 Wilson, B. 1994. Australian Marine Shells. Prosobranch Gastropods. Kallaroo, WA : Odyssey Publishing Vol. 2 370 pp.

External links
 
  Tucker, J.K. 2004 Catalog of recent and fossil turrids (Mollusca: Gastropoda). Zootaxa 682:1-1295

torquata
Gastropods of Australia